This is an index of lists about men.

Arts 

 Hasty Pudding Man of the Year

Fictional characters 

 List of male detective characters

Film and television 

 List of male performers in gay porn films

Politics 

 List of first gentlemen in the United States

Religion 

 List of Jesuits

Sports

Basketball 

 ACC 50th Anniversary men's basketball team
 Huskies of Honor
 List of All-Pac-12 Conference men's basketball teams
 Pac-12 Conference Men's Basketball Hall of Honor
 UCLA Bruins men's basketball retired numbers
 List of Florida Gators in the NBA
 List of Texas Longhorns in the NBA
 List of UCLA Bruins in the NBA

Tennis 

Chronological list of men's Grand Slam tennis champions
List of Australian Open men's singles champions
List of Australian Open men's doubles champions
List of French Open men's singles champions
List of French Open men's doubles champions
List of Grand Slam men's doubles champions
List of Grand Slam men's singles champions
List of male tennis players
List of Open Era Grand Slam men's singles finals
List of US Open men's singles champions
List of US Open men's doubles champions

Other 

 List of Eagle Scouts
 List of male underwear models
 List of oldest fathers
 List of the verified oldest men
 List of youngest birth fathers